Epicopeia is a genus of moths in the family Epicopeiidae. The species in this genus mimic butterflies of the agehana-group in the genus Papilio and Atrophaneura alcinous.

Species
Epicopeia battaka Dohrn, 1895
Epicopeia caroli Janet, 1909
Epicopeia hainesii Holland, 1889
Epicopeia leucomelaena Oberthür, 1919
Epicopeia mencia Moore, [1875]
Epicopeia philenora Westwood, 1841
Epicopeia polydora Westwood, 1841

Former species
Epicopeia albofasciata Djakonov, 1926
Epicopeia longicauda Matsumura, 1931

References

 , 1978: Genus Epicopeia Westwood from Japan, Korea and Taiwan : Lepidoptera:Epicopeidae. Tyô to Ga 29 (2): 69-75. Abstract and full article: .
 , 1999: Two new subspecies of Epicopeia battaka (Lepidoptera, Epicopeiidae). Transactions of the Lepidopterological Society of Japan 50(1): 48-50. Abstract and full article: 

Epicopeiidae